Apollo Kids is the ninth studio album by American rapper and Wu-Tang Clan-member Ghostface Killah, released on December 21, 2010, by Def Jam Recordings. Guests on the album include several Wu-Tang members and affiliates, as well as Redman, Black Thought, Busta Rhymes, Joell Ortiz, and Game, among others.

Apollo Kids is the follow-up to Ghostface's R&B-oriented Ghostdini: Wizard of Poetry in Emerald City (2009) and serves as a return to the characteristic "Wu-Tang Sound". Ghostface Killah recorded the album at Red Bull Studios and Stark Studios in New York City. He conceived it as a mixtape for Def Jam after having partially recorded the Supreme Clientele sequel album and opting not to release that with the label.

Although it only charted at number 120 on the Billboard 200, Apollo Kids received universal acclaim from music critics, who praised its gritty aesthetic and Ghostface Killah's unfiltered rapping.

Background 
Ghostface Killah partially recorded the announced sequel album Supreme Clientele Presents... Blue & Cream: The Wally Era near the end of his contract deal with Def Jam Recordings, but after receiving the advance, he instead offered the label Apollo Kids, a lead-in mixtape he subsequently converted into an album, in order to satisfy the contract and shop the sequel album independently. He later said of the exchange with Def Jam in a 2012 interview for Complex:

Apollo Kids was recorded by Ghostface at Red Bull Studios and Starks Studios in Staten Island, New York.

Reception 

The album debuted at number 128 on the US Billboard 200 chart, with first-week sales of 13,000 copies in the United States. It also entered at number 28 on Billboards R&B/Hip-Hop Albums and at number 10 on its Rap Albums chart.

Apollo Kids received universal acclaim from music critics. At Metacritic, which assigns a normalized rating out of 100 to reviews from mainstream critics, the album received an average score of 84, based on 17 reviews. Allmusic's David Jeffries called it "a return to the grimey soul and stream-of-consciousness street flow of the man’s best work". The A.V. Clubs Nathan Rabin stated, "The disc’s tightness, cohesion, and quality are even more surprising: Ghostface hasn’t sounded this hungry or focused since Fishscale [...] At its best, Ghostface’s music is about raw, visceral emotion and unfiltered rage". Entertainment Weeklys Simon Vozick-Levinson viewed it as a timeless addition to Ghostface's catalogue and complimented its "jittery pulp fiction and zany free-associative zingers over scratchy soul, funk, and rock samples". Rolling Stone writer Jonah Weiner stated "On track after track, he blows dust off some dirty-soul loop, with boasts as inspired as ever [...] and street-crime storytelling as vivid as ever". Slant Magazine's Huw Jones complimented the album's "back-to-basics approach" and called it "a compact release that celebrates the staples of vintage rap music and, more specifically, vintage Wu".

David Amidon of PopMatters stated "it feels like a work of boundless energy", but is, "essentially, the safest and most accessible album yet from Ghostface Killah, often hinting at the associative insanity he’s capable of without ever fully taking us there". Pitchfork Media's Ian Cohen noted a "lack of any sort of organizational principle" and commented that "basically arbitrary sequencing never allows too much momentum to build", but commended Ghostface's "harried intensity" and stated "he's still an incredibly ostentatious lyricist, just one that's easier to parse". MSN Music's Robert Christgau gave the album a three-star honorable mention, indicating "an enjoyable effort consumers attuned to its overriding aesthetic or individual vision may well treasure." He cited "In tha Park" and "Purified Thoughts" as highlights and quipped, "Living off his past, but it's quite a past and a damned decent living".

Track listing 

Sample credits
 "Purified Thoughts" contains samples of "Am I a Good Man", written by Willie Clarke, originally performed by Them Two courtesy of The Numero Group.
 "Superstar" contains samples of the recording "He's a Superstar" as performed by Roy Ayers, written by Roy Ayers and Myrna Williams.
 "Black Tequila" contains samples of the recording "Jogan Ban Gayiu" as performed by Asha Bhosle, written by Anand Bakshi and Pyarelal Laxmikant.
 "2getha Baby" contains samples of "Together" performed by The Intruders, written by Kenneth Gamble and Leon Huff.
 "Starkology" contains excerpts from "Theme from Star Wars" performed by David Matthews, written by David Matthews.
 "In tha Park" contains samples of the recording "I'm Alive" performed by Johnny Thunder, written by Tommy James and Pete Lucia.
 "How You Like Me Baby" contains samples of "Different Strokes", written by John A. Cameron and John Zachary, originally performed by Syl Johnson.
 "Street Bullies" contains samples of the recording "You Are Just a Living Doll" performed by J. J. Barnes, written by David L. Jordan.
 "Ghetto" contains samples of the recording "Woman of the Ghetto" as performed by Marlena Shaw, written by Richard Evans, R. Miller, and Marlena Shaw.

Personnel 
Credits for Apollo Kids adapted from Allmusic.

 Anthony "Acid" Caputo – engineer, mixing, producer
 Big Mizza – producer
 Leesa D. Brunson – A&R
 Sean C. – producer
 Munk Le Cinq – fonts
 Dennis Coles – A&R, executive producer
 Tony Dawsey – mastering
 Frank Dukes – mixing, producer
 Javon Greene – A&R
 Joe "Thelonius" Harley – bass, keyboards
 Patrick Hegarty – art direction
 Jake One – producer
 Scram Jones – producer
 Deborah Mannis-Gardner – sample clearance

 Chino Maurice – producer
 Leon Michels – organ
 Mike Caruso – A&R, executive producer, management
 Nick Movshon – drums
 Briana Perkins – marketing
 Antonio "L.A." Reid – executive producer
 Pete Rock – mixing, producer
 Lenny S. – A&R
 Supa Engineer "Dura" – mixing
 Doug Wilson – mixing
 Yakub – producer
 Kristen Yiengst – art coordinator
 Adam Zia – legal counsel

Charts

References

External links 
 Official page at Def Jam
 Apollo Kids at Metacritic

2010 albums
Albums produced by Jake One
Albums produced by Pete Rock
Albums produced by Scram Jones
Def Jam Recordings albums
Ghostface Killah albums
Albums produced by Frank Dukes